Joust 2: Survival of the Fittest is an arcade game developed by Williams Electronics and released in 1986. It is a sequel to Williams' 1982 game Joust. Like its predecessor, Joust 2 is a 2D aerial combat game with platforms to land on. The player uses a button and joystick to control a knight riding a flying ostrich. The object is to progress through levels by defeating groups of enemy knights riding buzzards. Joust 2 features improved audio-visuals and new features such as mutant buzzards created by eggs falling into lava, the ability to transform from an ostrich to a flying horse, and differently themed levels. Waves no longer seamlessly flow into each other; the gameplay is divided into separate screens with transitions between them.

John Newcomer led development again, which began to create a kit allowing arcade owners to convert an existing cabinet into another game. The original Joust used a horizontal monitor, but Williams chose a vertically oriented screen for the kit as a result of the design's popularity at the time.

Released during the waning days of the golden age of arcade games, Joust 2 did not achieve the success that Joust reached. The game was not ported to contemporary home systems, but was later released as part of arcade game compilations.

Gameplay 

Joust 2 is a 2D combat game taking place in the air and on landing platforms, like its predecessor. The player controls a yellow knight riding a flying ostrich and navigates the game world with a two-way joystick and a button. The joystick controls the horizontal direction that the knight travels, while pressing the button makes the ostrich flap its wings. The rate at which the player repeatedly presses the button causes the ostrich to fly upward, hover, or slowly descend. The objective is to defeat groups of enemy knights riding buzzards that populate each level, referred to as a wave. Upon completing a wave, a more challenging one will begin.

Players navigate the knight to collide with enemies. If the protagonist's jousting lance is higher than that of the enemy, the villain is defeated and vice versa. A collision of equal elevations results in the two knights bouncing off each other. Joust 2 introduced a transformation ability that morphs the player's bird into a pegasus, which provides better offensive capabilities while on ground but poor flight capabilities. A second player can join the game. The two players can either cooperatively complete the waves or attack each other while competitively defeating enemies. Joust 2 also introduced additional gameplay elements such as eggs landing in the lava spawn larger Shadow Lords flying on scorpion tail buzzards, Crystal Bats (hatching from crystals embedded in the ledges), a Gold Egg that opens a quickly changing random event box when collected (requiring the player to contact the red button on the random event box before time runs out and it disappears), and buy-in to continue preserves the current score. Certain game events also have voice synthesis (such as "Let the jousting begin", at the start of the game, "Be careful warrior" when a player has one life left, and "Wish to continue?" when all lives are lost and the continue countdown starts).

The game allows its player(s) to "Choose Thy Skill Level" at the opening; in other words, the player(s) can select a stage to begin on. These levels range, from lowest to highest: Serf (Stage 1), Page (6), Squire (11), Knight (16), Lord (21), King (26).

Development 

Joust 2 was developed by Williams Electronics, with John Newcomer as the lead designer. The game features amplified monaural sound and raster graphics on a 19-inch color CRT monitor. Like other Williams arcade games, Joust 2 was programmed in assembly language. Williams' video game department had shrunk following a decline in the video game industry. The company wanted to sell an arcade conversion kit for games that use a vertically oriented monitor, which had become popular at the time. Management felt that a sequel would improve the kit's saleability. The company decided to release a sequel to either Robotron: 2084 or Joust, ultimately choosing the latter. Technology had progressed since the original's release, providing more flexibility than before. As a result, Newcomer conceived new elements: additional characters, improved audio-visuals, and new mechanics. To portray a progression of villains, the staff added a new enemy, Knight Lord. The developers added backgrounds to the levels, inspired by artwork by M. C. Escher, Newcomer's favorite artist. Staff added a transform button to provide players with more variety and balance the gameplay.

Reception 

Williams shipped around 1,000 units of Joust 2, significantly fewer than its predecessor. Brett Alan Weiss of Allgame and Mike Bevan of Retro Gamer attributed the poor numbers to an industry slump in the mid-1980s. Joust 2 arcade cabinets have since become fairly rare among collectors. Weiss negatively compared the game to its predecessor, calling Joust more popular and enjoyable. However, he commented that Joust 2s graphics are more detailed and robust.

In retrospect, Newcomer expressed dissatisfaction with the game's design, specifically the monitor's orientation. He commented that the gameplay works best with a horizontal orientation or with multi-directional scrolling. The vertical orientation proved to be a hindrance for home conversion.

Legacy

While Joust was widely ported to home systems, Joust 2 was only made available as part of emulated collections. In 1997, it was released as part of Arcade's Greatest Hits: The Midway Collection 2. Joust 2 was also included in the 2003 and 2012 multi-platform compilations Midway Arcade Treasures and Midway Arcade Origins, respectively. It also appeared in 2016's Lego Dimensions.

References

1986 video games
Action video games
Arcade video games
Assembly language software
Cooperative video games
Head-to-head arcade video games
Midway video games
Williams video games
Video games about birds
Video games developed in the United States
Video games scored by Chris Granner